Sajid Mahmood Bhatti  (born 16 April 1963) better known as Bhatti Sajid Sharif  is a Pakistani politician. He is also founder of the Saleem Akhtar Memorial Welfare Hospital & Chairman of pakistan Muslim League Sajid Bhatti group

Bhatti views Kashmir issue as a humanitarian problem contrary to the concept of territorial dispute between two countries (India and Pakistan). He also proposed secret talks to settle the issue as he thinks the vested interests on both sides will try to subvert them. He ruled out a military solution to the conflict and denied the possibility of a fourth war between India and Pakistan over the disputed mountainous region.

Publications
Bhatti periodically writes editorials on Pakistani politics in several leading Pakistani and British newspapers. 
Books

See also
 Gujar Khan

References

1963 births
Living people